Streptomyces collinus is a bacterium species from the genus of Streptomyces which has been isolated from soil in Baden in Germany. Streptomyces collinus produces ansatrienin A2, ansatrienin A3, ansatrienin B, naphthomycin A, collinomycine, toromycin, streptocollin, kirromycin and rubromycine.

Further reading

See also 
 List of Streptomyces species

References

External links
Type strain of Streptomyces collinus at BacDive -  the Bacterial Diversity Metadatabase

collinus
Bacteria described in 1952